Yeli-ye Olya (also Romanized as Yelī-ye ‘Olyā; also known as Yelī) is a village in Qeshlaq Rural District, Abish Ahmad District, Kaleybar County, East Azerbaijan Province, Iran. At the 2006 census, its population was 163, in 35 families.

References 

Populated places in Kaleybar County